or  is an island in Troms og Finnmark county, Norway, Europe. It has a wild, mountainous outer (western) side facing the Atlantic, and a mild and lush inner (eastern) side. The island is located within Senja Municipality, which was established on 1 January 2020. The island of Senja had 7,864 inhabitants as of 1 January 2017. Most of the residents live along the eastern coast of the island, with Silsand being the largest urban area on the island. The fishing village of Gryllefjord on the west coast has a summer-only ferry connection to the nearby island of Andøya:  the Andenes–Gryllefjord Ferry.

The island sits northeast of the Vesterålen archipelago, surrounded by the Norwegian Sea to the northwest, the Malangen fjord to the northeast, the Gisundet strait to the east, the Solbergfjorden to the southeast, the Vågsfjorden to the south, and the Andfjorden to the west. Ånderdalen National Park is located in the southern part of the island.

Etymology 
The Old Norse form of the name is believed to have been Senja or perhaps Sændja. The meaning of the name is unknown, but it might be related to the verb sundra, which means to "tear" or "split apart", possibly because the west coast of the island is torn and split by numerous small fjords. It might also be derived from a Proto-Norse form of the word Sandijōn, meaning "(area) of sand" or "sandy island".

Geography

The island of Senja is located along the Troms og Finnmark county coastline with Finnsnes as the closest town. Senja is connected to the mainland by the Gisund Bridge. The municipalities located on Senja are Lenvik (part of which is on the mainland), Berg, Torsken, and Tranøy.

The northern coasts of Senja face the open sea, the western coast faces the islands of Andøya and Krøttøya, and the southern coast faces the islands of Andørja and Dyrøya.  On the western coast, steep and rugged mountains rise straight from the sea, with some fishing villages (like Gryllefjord and Husøy) tucked into the small lowland areas between the mountains and the sea. The eastern and southern parts of the island are milder, with rounder mountains, forests, rivers, and agricultural land.

Senja is often referred to as "Norway in miniature", as the island's diverse scenery reflects almost the entire span of Norwegian natural geography. Senja is known domestically for its scenery and is marketed as a tourist attraction.

Climate
Laukhella is near Silsand on Senja island, facing the mainland towards the east. The Eastern part of Senja has an atypical boreal climate, as the wettest season is autumn and winter, and winters are also milder than typical for this climate. The western part of Senja facing the Norwegian Sea has a more subpolar oceanic climate (Cfc) like the Hekkingen lighthouse.

Hekkingen island in Senja municipality is closer to the open sea, has milder winters, and has a subpolar oceanic climate like western Senja.

Older climate data from the village Gibostad on the eastern shore of the island; facing the mainland, during 1961-1990.

Economy
Naturally, the fishing industry is dominant on Senja, notably the Nergård Group at Senjahopen and Brødrene Karlsen at Husøy. Skaland has some graphite mining. Another important industry is ArtNord and Tromspotet at Silsand, which specializes in potato and potato products. Sollia has a stair factory and the world's northernmost fibreglass insulation factory, Nicopan AS, which has customers throughout Norway, and exports abroad.

Transportation
The residents of Senja have the Gisund Bridge as a ferry-free road connection to the mainland across Gisundet to the town of Finnsnes. The town serves as a trading center for the entire Mid-Troms region, including the island of Senja.  The island is also connected with the other towns in the county. At Lysnes on northern Senja, you have a fast boat connection with the city of Tromsø, a trip that takes about 50 minutes. From the villages of Flakstadvåg and Skrolsvik on the west and south side of the island, there are also ferries to the town of Harstad to the south. During the summer there is a ferry between northern Senja and the island of Kvaløya, between southern Senja and Harstad, and between Gryllefjord and Andenes.

Senja has four main roads. The main road is Norwegian County Road 86 which crosses the Gisund Bridge from Finnsnes, Sørreisa, and Bardufoss. It extends across the island to Torsken and Gryllefjord. From Silsand, Norwegian County Road 861 goes north along Gisundet to Gibostad and northern Senja. Norwegian County Road 860 goes from Stonglandseidet to Silsand, Norwegian County Road 862 goes from Straumsbotn in Berg, via Senjahopen to Botnhamn in Lenvik.

Governance 

In March 2017, the Parliament of Norway voted to merge the municipalities of Berg, Torsken, Lenvik, and Tranøy. The new municipality was established on 1 January 2020 as Senja Municipality. It is located in the traditional district of Hålogaland.  The administrative centre of the municipality became the town of Finnsnes. The municipality includes all of the islands of Senja, the smaller surrounding islands, and part of the mainland between the Gisundet strait and the Malangen fjord.

Attractions
Among the sights of the island are Ånderdalen National Park, with coastal pine forests and mountains, traditional fishing communities, and previously the Senja Troll, the world's largest troll statue (which burned down 28 March 2019). The southernmost municipality Tranøy also has a number of small museums documenting local history, notably the Halibut Museum ("Kveitmuseet") in Skrolsvik.

In popular culture
The island of Senja is mentioned in David Armine Howarth's World War II book, and true story, We Die Alone: A WWII Epic of Escape and Endurance. It has a namesake island in the MMORPG Tibia.

The Norwegian musician Moddi comes from the island and his music is said to have been influenced by its beauty.

The Norwegian musician Biosphere lives in Senja (as of 2018-19) and his album The Senja Recordings, which was recorded in Senja, refers to several places in Senja (Bergsbotn, Steinfjord, etc.).

Gallery

See also
List of islands of Norway

References

External links

Alpin moro på eventyrøya Senja 

 
Islands of Troms og Finnmark